Mariana Gesteira Ribeiro (born 28 June 1995) is a Brazilian Paralympic swimmer. She competed at the 2020 Summer Paralympics in Tokyo, where she won the bronze medal in the 100 meter freestyle event in the S9 class.

Career
Ribeiro learned to swim at the age of ten. At 14, she was diagnosed with Arnold Chiari syndrome, a condition that affects the brain and nervous system.

References

1995 births
Living people
Sportspeople from Rio de Janeiro (state)
Brazilian female backstroke swimmers
Brazilian female freestyle swimmers
Medalists at the World Para Swimming Championships
Medalists at the 2020 Summer Paralympics
Swimmers at the 2016 Summer Paralympics
Swimmers at the 2020 Summer Paralympics
Paralympic bronze medalists for Brazil
Paralympic medalists in swimming
S9-classified Paralympic swimmers
21st-century Brazilian women
People from Itaboraí